Hong Kong Air Cargo Terminals Limited, commonly known as Hactl, is one of the leading air cargo terminal operators in the world. Located at Hong Kong International Airport, it handled a total throughput of 1.65 million tonnes of cargo in 2018.

History
Hong Kong Air Cargo Terminals Limited (Hactl) was founded in 1971 in Hong Kong. It started its air cargo logistics operations at the Kai Tak International Airport, Kowloon Peninsula in 1976 and it was the only air cargo terminal operator in town at that time. On 6 July 1998, it was relocated to SuperTerminal 1 (ST1) at Hong Kong International Airport, Chek Lap Kok, Lantau Island, Hong Kong.

Shareholders
Hactl is jointly owned by the following shareholders.
Jardine Pacific: 41.67%
Wharf Holdings: 20.83%
CK Hutchison Holdings: 20.83%
China National Aviation Holding: 16.67%

See also
SuperTerminal 1

References

External links
Hong Kong Air Cargo Terminals Limited 
Report of the Commission of Inquiry on the New Hong Kong Airport Incident 

Transport companies established in 1971
Chek Lap Kok
Logistics companies of Hong Kong
Jardine Matheson Group
The Wharf (Holdings)
CK Hutchison Holdings
Air China
Transport operators of Hong Kong
1971 establishments in Hong Kong